McCraw Glacier is a glacier in the Britannia Range, Antarctica, draining the northwest slopes of Mount Olympus and flowing north, westward of Johnstone Ridge, to enter Hatherton Glacier. It was named by a University of Waikato geological party, 1978–79, led by Michael Selby, and named for John D. McCraw, Dean of Science at the university, a member on a 1959–60 field party to the McMurdo Dry Valleys.

Further reading 
 Jane G. Ferrigno, Kevin M. Foley, Charles Swithinbank, and Richard S. Williams, Jr., Coastal-Change and Glaciological Map of the Ross Island Area, Antarctica: 1962–2005, U.S. Geological Survey Geologic Investigations Series Map I–2600–I, 1 map sheet, 23-p. text.

References

Glaciers of Oates Land